Paracordylodontidae is an extinct family of conodonts in the clade Prioniodontida, also known as the "complex conodonts".

Genera
Genera are:
 †Cooperignathus
 †Fahraeusodus
 †Oelandodus
 †Paracordylodus
 †Protoprioniodus

References

External links 

Prioniodontida
Conodont families